Ricardo Antonio Phillips Hinds (born 6 May 2001) is a Panamanian footballer who currently plays for  Deportivo del Este as a right-winger.

Club career

DAC Dunajská Streda
Hinds made his professional Fortuna Liga debut for DAC Dunajská Streda in a home fixture in MOL Aréna against Senica on 16 February 2020. Despite this being his first appearance, Hinds was featured in the starting line-up. He completed 55 minutes of the game before being replaced by András Schäfer.

Personal life
He is a son of a former Panamanian international footballer Ricardo Phillips.

References

External links
FC DAC 1904 Dunajská Streda official club profile
Futbalnet profile

2001 births
Living people
Sportspeople from Panama City
Association football midfielders
Panamanian expatriate footballers
Panamanian footballers
FC DAC 1904 Dunajská Streda players
MFK Zemplín Michalovce players
Costa del Este F.C. players
Slovak Super Liga players
Liga Panameña de Fútbol players
Expatriate footballers in Slovakia
Panamanian expatriate sportspeople in Slovakia